Charlotte or The Murdered Young Girl is a 1974 erotic crime thriller film directed by Roger Vadim. It stars Sirpa Lane, Michel Duchaussoy, and Mathieu Carrière. The film is about a nymphomaniac.

Cast

 Sirpa Lane as Charlotte Marley 
 Michel Duchaussoy as Serge 
 Mathieu Carrière as Eric von Schellenberg 
 Roger Vadim as Georges Viguier 
 Alexandre Astruc as Guy, the editor  
 Anne-Marie Deschodt as  Eliane 
 Élisabeth Wiener as Elisabeth 
 Thérèse Liotard as Louise 
 Sabine Glaser as Agnès 
 Anthony Steffen as Prince Sforza

Release
Charlotte was released in Paris on 27 November 1974. The film had 497,542 admissions in France.

Reception
Although it was a commercial success, it was disapproved of by many critics. New York Magazine called it an "arrogant piece of vacuous pornography", and added "if anyone had any doubts about Vadim's utter worthlessness this irritatingly pseudointellectual garbage should allay them".

References

External links

Film review at The New York Times

French crime thriller films
1974 films
Films directed by Roger Vadim
1970s erotic drama films
1970s crime thriller films
Films about sexuality
French erotic drama films
Italian crime thriller films
Italian erotic thriller films
1974 drama films
1970s Italian films
1970s French films